Irving Novick (April 11, 1916 – October 15, 2004) was an American comics artist who worked almost continuously from 1939 until the 1990s.

Career
A graduate of the National Academy of Design, Irv Novick got his start in the workshop of Harry "A" Chesler. From about 1939 to 1946, Novick was working for MLJ Comics, the company that would later be known as Archie Comics. He became the primary artist for their superhero comics, including the characters the Shield (the first patriotic superhero), Bob Phantom, the Hangman, and Steel Sterling, until MLJ cut back on these titles to focus more on their Archie comics.

He joined the United States Army on April 17, 1943.

From 1946 to 1951, Novick worked in advertising and for the largely unsuccessful comic strips Cynthia and The Scarlet Avenger. His long association with DC Comics began when he was hired by editor Robert Kanigher, who had previously written Novick-illustrated comics for MLJ. Novick and Kanigher would be friends and colleagues for many years. Initially, Novick was primarily an artist on war comics such as Our Army at War and occasionally romance comics. Kanigher and Novick introduced the Silent Knight character in The Brave and the Bold #1 (Aug. 1955).

Novick left DC for the Johnstone and Cushing advertising agency in the 1960s, but was unhappy in advertising and was lured back to DC by Kanigher with a freelance contract, a guarantee of steady work and certain perks which was at the time unprecedented. After editorial and management changes in 1968, Novick began drawing superhero titles such as Batman, Superman's Girl Friend, Lois Lane, and The Flash. Novick and writer Frank Robbins crafted the story which revealed the last name of Batman's butler Alfred Pennyworth in Batman #216 (Nov. 1969). The Robbins and Novick team was instrumental in returning Batman to the character's gothic roots, such as in the story "One Bullet Too Many". Robbins and Novick created the Ten-Eyed Man in Batman #226 (Nov. 1970) and the Spook in Detective Comics #434 (April 1973). He and Dennis O'Neil launched The Joker series in May 1975. Novick drew the introductions of Duela Dent in Batman Family #6 (July–Aug. 1976) and the Electrocutioner in Batman #331 (Jan. 1981). Novick continued to work, still under contract, until failing eyesight prompted his retirement in the 1990s.

Influence
A panel Novick drew in All-American Men of War #89 (Jan.–Feb. 1962) of a U.S. Air Force plane shooting down an enemy plane with the onomatopoeia "WHAAM!" was later appropriated for Roy Lichtenstein's painting of that name.

Awards
Irv Novick received an Inkpot Award in 1995.

Bibliography

DC Comics

Action Comics (Superman) #537–538, 569 (1982–1985)
Adventure Comics (The Flash) #459–461 (1978–1979)
All-American Men of War #127–128 (1952)
All-American Men of War vol. 2 #4–10, 16, 19, 21–23, 25, 33, 35, 40, 45–46, 50, 54, 56, 61, 70, 77, 81–89, 92–111, 115, 117 (1953–1966)
Batman #204–207, 209–212, 214–217, 219–222, 224–227, 229–231, 234–236, 239–242, 244–250, 252–254, 256–261, 266, 268, 271, 286, 310–311, 313–320, 322–335, 338–339, 341–342 (1968–1981)
Batman Family (Robin) #6, 8, 12; (Robin and Batgirl) #9 (1976–1977)
The Brave and the Bold #1–21, 88 (1955–1970)
Captain Storm #1–11, 14, 17–18 (1964–1967)
DC Comics Presents #40, 42, 44, 48, 60, 62, 69, 83 (1981–1985)
DC Special Series (The Flash) #1, 11 (1977–1978)
Detective Comics (Elongated Man) #364 (1967); (Batman) #414, 418–419, 425, 427, 431, 434–435, 489, 521–522, 595 (1971–1988); (Green Arrow) #523–525 (1983)
Falling In Love #1 (1955)
The Flash #200–204, 206–212, 215–263, 265–270 (1970–1979)
The Flash Special #1 (1990)
G.I. Combat #48, 50–51, 58, 75, 82, 85, 89–92, 94, 97, 110, 116, 118–120, 122–124, 127 (1957–1967)
Girls' Love Stories #27 (1954)
Green Lantern (Green Lantern Corps) #157–158 (1982)
The Joker #1–2, 5–9 (1975–1976)
Our Army at War #1–6, 8, 11–13, 15–17, 19, 21–24, 26, 28, 34–35, 40–43, 45, 55, 64, 71, 77, 82, 84, 104, 106, 122, 124, 126, 128, 154, 157, 167 (1952–1966)
Our Fighting Forces #1–2, 5–6, 8, 12–14, 23, 26, 30–31, 57, 65, 67–68, 73–74, 93–99, 104 (1954–1966)
Robin Hood Tales #8 (1957)
Sea Devils #11–12, 14–15 (1963–1964)
Secret Origins, vol. 2, (Rocket Red) #34; (Teen Titans) Annual #3 (1988–1989)
Star Spangled War Stories #13, 21, 23–25, 29–30, 35–36, 40–41, 43, 47–48, 51, 63, 65, 67, 71, 90, 98, 101–102, 109, 116 (1953–1964)
Strange Sports Stories #2, 4–5 (1973–1974)
Superman #393, 406–407, Special #3 (1984–1985)
The Superman Family (Mr. and Mrs. Superman) #213–215, 221 (1981–1982)
Superman's Girl Friend, Lois Lane #82–85, 87–88, 90, 93, 96–103 (1968–1970)
Teen Titans #8–10, 12, 45–46 (1967–1977)
Tomahawk #113 (1967)
Wonder Woman #173–176, 213, 318 (1967–1984)
World's Finest Comics (Superman and Batman) #281–282; (The Atom) #283 (1982)

References

Further reading
Interview, Comic Book Marketplace #77 (April 2000), pp. 46–52. Gemstone Publishing. Reprinted in Alter Ego #82 (December 2008). TwoMorrows Publishing.

External links
"DC Profiles #59: Irv Novick" at the Grand Comics Database
Irv Novick at Mike's Amazing World of Comics
Tales from The Bible at "Professor H's Wayback Machine"

1916 births
2004 deaths
20th-century American artists
Advertising artists and illustrators
American comics artists
Artists from the Bronx
DC Comics people
Golden Age comics creators
Inkpot Award winners
National Academy of Design alumni
People from Dobbs Ferry, New York
Silver Age comics creators
United States Army soldiers